Kristin Ann Hass is an American writer and professor. She studies memory and memorialization, as well as public and engaged humanities.

Education 
After growing up in northern California, Hass received her BA and MA from the University of Michigan, as well as her PhD (1994) in American studies.

Career 
Kristin Ann Hass is a Professor in the Department of American Culture at the University of Michigan. She is the Faculty Coordinator of the Michigan Humanities Collaboratory. She lectures, teaches, and writes about cultural memory, nationalism, memorialization, militarization, racialization, museums, visual culture, and material culture studies.

Hass was also the co-founder and Associate Director of Imagining America: Artists and Scholars in Public Life, a national consortium of educators and activists dedicated to campus-community collaborations.

Publications 
Hass has written three books:

 Blunt Instruments: Recognizing Racist Infrastructure in Memorials, Museums, and Patriotic Practices (2023) helps readers to identify, classify, and name elements of our everyday landscapes and cultural practices that are designed to seem benign or natural but which, in fact, work to maintain powerful structures of inequity. 
 Sacrificing Soldiers on the National Mall (2013) is a study of militarism, race, war memorials, and U.S. nationalism.
 Carried to the Wall: American Memory and the Vietnam Veterans Memorial (1998) is an exploration of public memorial practices, material culture studies and the legacies of the Vietnam War.

Writer Adam Gopnik referred to Hass' scholarship in a 2014 article in The New Yorker:In a 1998 book, "Carried to the Wall," the American-studies scholar Kristin Ann Hass shows that arguments about making public memorials to private lives lost began in the middle of our Civil War, and, specifically, in decisions made about how to commemorate the Battle of Gettysburg. She reproduces the pathetic lists—although merely a preliminary to identifying the fallen, they were not something that would ever have been attempted in an earlier war—of what was in the pockets of the dead: “E. Cunningham—$3.95, comb, and postage stamps; S. R. White—stencil, plate, and two cents.” What would, in an earlier battle, have been anonymous corpses were being claimed as individual men again. Hass shows that the idea of the popular particularized commemoration, name by name, began then, with the work done there. A “folk” tradition of preserved ephemera—the kind of thing we see in those “roadside memorials” that one finds from Naples to Newark, marking the spot where a motorist was killed—began to vie with the official tradition.Hass is also the editor of Being Human During COVID (2021), a collection of essays written during the pandemic that try to make sense of a suddenly unfamiliar present through the lens of humanities thought. It was published by the University of Michigan Press and is available online open source.

References 

1965 births
Living people
University of Michigan faculty
American studies scholars